This is a list of the Spanish PROMUSICAE Top 20 Singles number-ones of 2003.

See also 
 2003 in music
 List of number-one hits (Spain)

References 

2003
Spain Singles
Number-one singles